Monte Romano is a  (municipality) in the Province of Viterbo in the Italian region of Latium, located about  northwest of Rome and about  southwest of Viterbo.

Main sights
Civic Tower (or Watch Tower)
Fontana del Mascherone ("Big Mask Fountain")
Church of the Santo Spirito
17th-century castle of Roccarespampani

References

Cities and towns in Lazio
Castles in Italy